Kentish may be used as a name:
Kentish Council is a local government area in Tasmania, Australia
Kentish Town is an area of north west London, England

Kentish as a surname:
John Kentish (minister), 1768–1853
John Kentish (tenor), 1910–2006, English opera singer

Kentish may also be an adjective for things relating to the English county of Kent or the former Kingdom of Kent:
 Kentish dialect, the dialect of Modern English spoken in Kent
 Kentish dialect (Old English), a dialect of Old English
 Kentish Man or Maid
 Old Kentish Carol, a traditional Christmas carol from Kent

See also
Kent (disambiguation)
Kentish plover